The 2020 United States presidential election in Georgia was held on Tuesday, November 3, 2020, as part of the 2020 United States presidential election in which all 50 states plus the District of Columbia participated. Georgia voters chose electors to represent them in the Electoral College via a popular vote, pitting the Republican Party's nominee, incumbent President Donald Trump of Florida, and running mate Vice President Mike Pence of Indiana against Democratic Party nominee, former Vice President Joe Biden of Delaware, and his running mate California Senator Kamala Harris. Georgia has 16 electoral votes in the Electoral College.

Biden narrowly won Georgia by a margin of 0.23% and 11,779 votes. Leading up to the election, Georgia was seen as a key swing state in both the presidential and senatorial elections—both a regular Class II U.S. Senate election and a special election—due to the rapid growth and diversification of Atlanta's suburbs, where Republicans were once dominant. Polls of the state throughout the campaign indicated a close race, and prior to election day, most news organizations considered Georgia a toss-up. This was the only state in the Deep South carried by Biden, made possible by significant racial demographic shifts over the previous decade, especially in Metro Atlanta. While Georgia is still a GOP stronghold at the state level, this has resulted in the state becoming a highly competitive swing state at the federal level albeit with still a red tilt. 

Like in other states, Trump had an early lead on election night due to the state counting in-person votes first on that day, before counting mail-in ballots over the following days. Biden subsequently cut into Trump's margin over the course of the week and eventually overtook Trump on Friday morning. Although majority-minority Burke County—near Augusta—flipped to Trump after supporting Hillary Clinton in 2016, Biden was able to build Clinton's vote shares in the densely populated Metro Atlanta counties of Gwinnett, Cobb, and Henry, increasing her vote shares of 50%, 48%, and 50% to 58%, 56%, and 60%, respectively–in all three cases, the best showing for a non-Georgian Democrat since John F. Kennedy in the 1960 election. This helped Biden win the state by a plurality, despite not flipping any counties. 

Due to the close margins in the initial election results, Georgia Secretary of State Brad Raffensperger announced on November 11 that a full audit by hand would be conducted. The audit was completed on November 18, and Biden was confirmed to be the winner on November 19.

Trump would engage in unsuccessful attempts to overturn the results, challenging Raffensperger in a widely publicized phone-call to "find" 11,000 more votes. Actions taken by Trump allies in Georgia, including a scheme to send fake electors to Congress, are currently under criminal investigation.

Biden became the first Democrat to carry the state since Bill Clinton in 1992; the first to win a statewide election in Georgia since 2006; the first to carry a state in the Deep South since Bill Clinton carried Louisiana in 1996; and the first to gain over 70% of the vote in Fulton County since Franklin D. Roosevelt in 1944. He was also the first non-Southern Democrat to carry a state in the Deep South since Kennedy in 1960.

This is the first time since 1992 that Georgia voted more Democratic than neighboring Florida and the first time since 2000 that it voted more Democratic than also-neighboring North Carolina. Additionally, it was the first time since 1860 that Laurens County and Monroe County did not vote for the statewide winner. Biden also became the first Democrat to win the White House without carrying Baker, Burke, Dooly, Peach, Quitman, or Twiggs counties since Lyndon B. Johnson in 1964.

Georgia was one of 2 states that Obama (whom Biden served under as VP) lost in both 2008 and 2012 that Biden carried. The other state being Arizona.

Georgia weighed in for this election as 4.2% more Republican than the nation-at-large. Georgia marked the strongest leftward shift in a state that Trump carried in 2016, as the state’s PVI shifted 3 points more Democratic since then.

Primary elections
The presidential preference primary was originally scheduled for March 24, 2020. On March 14, it was moved to May 19 due to concerns over the COVID-19 pandemic. On April 9, the preference primary was again rescheduled to June 9, being combined with the regular, usually-separate primary for other federal and state primaries as well as local elections in some counties, the first time in Georgia history that all primaries were combined on the same date. Secretary of State Raffensperger approved sending out absentee ballot application forms to 6.9 million active voters for the combined primary, of which 1.1 million absentee ballots were requested. The total turnout for the combined primary was the highest since the 2008 presidential primary, and broke the record for most absentee ballots cast in a Georgia primary.

Republican primary
Incumbent President Donald Trump ran unopposed in the Republican primary and thus received all of Georgia's 76 delegates to the 2020 Republican National Convention.

Democratic primary

General election

Final predictions

Polling
Graphical summary

Aggregate polls

Polls

Donald Trump vs. Michael Bloomberg

Donald Trump vs. Pete Buttigieg

Donald Trump vs. Kamala Harris

Donald Trump vs. Bernie Sanders

Donald Trump vs. Elizabeth Warren

Donald Trump vs. Generic Opponent

Electoral slates
These slates of electors were nominated by each party in order to vote in the Electoral College should their candidates win the state:

Turnout
Voter registration for the 2020 general elections ended on October 5 in Georgia, with a final total of 7,233,584 active registered voters, an increase of 1,790,538 new voters since the 2016 election and 805,003 new voters since the 2018 gubernatorial election. Absentee mail ballots were first sent out on September 15. Unlike the June 9 combined primary, Georgia Secretary of State Brad Raffensperger declined to mail out absentee ballot request forms for the November 3 election, and instead established a website for registered voters to apply for an absentee ballot; in addition, third-party non-profit organizations such as the Voter Participation Center sent out over 2.2 million absentee request forms to registered voters by mail, including to voters who did not have computers nor Internet access. 1,731,117 absentee ballots were requested by mail or online by voters by the deadline of October 23. The Secretary of State's office allowed counties to install multiple drop boxes for absentee voters to bypass the postal system, on the condition that the drop boxes be installed on county government property and surveilled with 24-hour cameras. 

Early in-person voting began on October 12. Complaints regarding hours-long early-voting lines soon arose across the state, especially in Metro Atlanta counties; state officials attributed the long durations of lines to voter enthusiasm and lack of preparation by county boards of elections. 

Raffensperger recorded 126,876 votes having been cast early or absentee across the state on October 12, a record turnout for the first day of early voting in a Georgia general election. The record turnout continued throughout the first week, with 1,555,622 having been cast by October 19. By October 21, 2,124,571 votes had been cast, over 50% of total votes cast in the 2016 election, and by October 30, over 50% of registered voters had cast their ballots.

Results

Following the November 3 general election, voters whose mail-in ballots were rejected could submit corrections until 5:00 p.m. on Friday, November 6.

Results by county

Counties that flipped from Democratic to Republican
 Burke (largest city: Waynesboro)

Results by congressional district
Trump won 8 of 14 congressional districts.

Voter demographics

Analysis 
Like its fellow Deep South neighbors, Georgia is a former Solid South state that had gradually become part of the red wall since the Reagan Revolution starting in 1984. While Southerner Bill Clinton carried the state in 1992 and nearly did again in 1996, Georgia became a safe red state in 2000 and 2004, and a lean red state from 2008 to 2016. 

Demographic changes and population shifts made Georgia trend blue, starting in 2016; Donald Trump carried Georgia by just over 5 points against Hillary Clinton. Further signalling Georgia's blue shift were the state 2018 midterms, where Democrat Stacey Abrams nearly won the governor's race against Republican Brian Kemp.

Georgia's trend towards the Democrats can be partly explained by the growth of the Atlanta metropolitan area. Atlanta has attracted many transplants from heavily blue-leaning areas of the United States. Additionally, the state's population is diversifying faster than that of most states, with the population of African Americans, Latinos, and Asians all growing over the last 10 years, and these blocs generally lean Democratic.

In what was likely the biggest key to Biden's victory in Georgia, the Democratic Party invested heavily in the state, with activist and gubernatorial candidate Stacey Abrams heading an effort to boost minority turnout, especially among African-American voters. The Democratic super PAC Priorities USA focused on Georgia near the end of the 2020 campaign, even sending former president Barack Obama to campaign in the state. Black voters made up 29% of the electorate, and Latinos made up about 7%, a significant increase compared to previous years.

Biden performed well across the board; he won independent voters by 9 points, and was able to pick up 6% of Republican voters in the state. Biden also won young voters in Georgia, sweeping each age group under 50 years old. Trump's strength in the state came from Southern whites—mainly those outside of Atlanta's urban area—as he easily won those without a college degree, especially in Georgia's rural areas; his vote share with college-educated whites dropped, however, and Trump only won suburban Georgia by 3 points this cycle.

Outside of Atlanta, Biden's strongest performances came in Georgia's other urban and suburban areas, such as Chatham County (Savannah), Muscogee County (Columbus), Richmond County (Augusta), Bibb County (Macon), and majority-college educated Clarke County (Athens). Trump, on the other hand, performed strongest in the northern and southeastern parts of the state, which are rural and were historically a hotbed for Dixiecrats.

Following the nationwide trend, Georgia's voting patterns were split between urban, suburban and rural areas. Biden won urban areas by 35 points, while Trump carried the suburbs by 3 points, and these areas combined made up 85% of the electorate, showing the rapidly evolving demographics of Georgia. Trump carried rural areas by 39 points.

Aftermath

Statewide audit and recount
On November 11, the Secretary of State of Georgia announced there would be a full statewide audit of each of the nearly 5 million ballots by hand, to be completed by November 20, 2020. On November 15, Georgia Secretary of State Brad Raffensperger, a Republican, denounced Trump's criticism of the state's recount process. 
During this audit, it was discovered that Fayette County had missed tabulating 2,755 votes, Floyd County had about 2,600 ballots that were never scanned, Douglas County failed to include a memory card from an Election Day precinct that included 156 votes, and Walton County discovered a memory card with 284 votes. The final statewide result from the completed audit is Biden with 2,475,141 votes and Trump with 2,462,857 votes, a spread of 12,284 votes. The result before the audit had been Biden with 2,473,383 votes and Trump with 2,459,825. Therefore, the results of the audit netted Trump 1,274 votes.

While the audit was ongoing, the Republican Senator of South Carolina, Lindsey Graham, privately called Raffensperger to discuss Georgia's vote counting. Raffensperger told The Washington Post that Graham had asked Raffensperger whether Raffensperger could disqualify all mail-in ballots in counties with more signature errors. Gabriel Sterling, a Republican election official and staffer to Raffensperger, was present in the call; Sterling confirmed that Graham had asked that question. Raffensperger viewed Graham's question as a suggestion to throw out legally-cast ballots, while Graham denied suggesting this. Graham acknowledged calling Raffensperger to find out how to "protect the integrity of mail-in voting" and "how does signature verification work"; but if Raffensperger "feels threatened by that conversation, he's got a problem". Graham stated that he was investigating in his own capacity as a senator, although he is the head of the Senate Judiciary Committee.

The results of the election were officially certified on November 20, 2020.

The Trump campaign had until November 24, 2020, to request a recount of the results. Unlike the statewide audit of each individual ballot by hand, the recount would involve a re-scanning of the voting machines. They filed a petition formally seeking the recount on November 21.

On December 2, Raffensperger suggested that Biden was likely to win the recount. Biden was later confirmed as the winner of the recount on December 7.

Disputes 

On November 19, Judge Steven D. Grimberg, a federal judge who was appointed by Trump in 2019, denied the Trump campaign's request to have further delay in the certification of the election results in Georgia.

On November 30, Gabriel Sterling, a top election official for the Georgia Secretary of State, gave a press conference in which he denounced death threats made against an election technician. Sterling appealed to President Trump: "Stop inspiring people to commit potential acts of violence. Someone's going to get hurt, someone's going to get shot, someone's going to get killed, and it's not right."

In December 14, 2020, Georgia's electoral votes were cast for Biden, formalizing his victory in the state, which Biden won by 11,779 votes. On the same day, a group of pro-Trump Republicans claimed to cast Georgia's electoral votes for Trump; the fake votes have no legal standing.

On January 2, 2021, Trump and Raffensperger spoke for one hour by telephone, during which Trump threatened Raffensperger by saying he was taking "a big risk" by declaring Biden as the victor. Referring to Biden’s 11,779-vote victory margin, Trump instructed Raffensperger that "there’s nothing wrong with saying, you know, um, that you’ve recalculated...I just want to find 11,780 votes."

On May 21, 2021, a Henry County Superior Court Judge, Brian Amero, agreed to unseal 147,000 absentee ballots from Fulton County. The petitioners in the case alleged that fraud had occurred – based on sworn affidavits provided by four election workers who all claimed to have handled thousands of fraudulent ballots. Secretary of State Brad Raffensperger welcomed the decision. "Fulton County has a long-standing history of election mismanagement that has understandably weakened voters' faith in its system. Allowing this audit provides another layer of transparency and citizen engagement." However, on June 25, 2021, Amero dismissed most of the lawsuit seeking to inspect the ballots. On October 13, Amero dismissed the suit altogether, closing the last legal challenge to Georgia election results, ruling the suit lacked standing because it "failed to allege a particularized injury."

On May 2, 2022, Raffensperger tweeted a link to a Just the News article outlining how Georgia election regulators have issued four subpoenas demanding the identity of a John Doe whistleblower and other evidence concerning an alleged ballot trafficking operation in the 2020 election. The subpoenas were sent to a Conservative election integrity group "True the Vote" who earlier provided information to Georgia officials that as many as 242 people (dubbed mules) illegally gathered third-party ballots during the battleground state's November 2020 election and subsequent U.S. Senate races and then stuffed the ballots into multiple mail-in-ballot drop boxes in numerous locations around the state. "Credible evidence was given to us that people were harvesting ballots," said Raffensperger to The National Desk's Jan Jeffcoat. "This information was provided to us and they said there's a witness, a 'John Doe.' And so we're looking at subpoenaing that person to get the information." True the Vote have worked with Dinesh D'Souza to help produce the 2022 movie "2000 mules" which alleges widespread fraud in the November 2020 election.

On August 15, 2022, it was announced that Rudolph W. "Rudy" Giuliani is a target of the Georgia election probe. On the same day, a federal judge, District Court Judge Leigh Martin May, ordered that Lindsey Graham testify before the grand jury.

See also
 United States presidential elections in Georgia
 Voter suppression in the United States 2019–2020: Georgia
 2020 United States presidential election
 2020 Democratic Party presidential primaries
 2020 Republican Party presidential primaries
 2020 United States elections

Notes

Partisan clients

References

Further reading
 
 
 . (Describes bellwether Peach County, Georgia)

External links
 
  (state affiliate of the U.S. League of Women Voters)
Elections  at the Georgia Secretary of State official website
 

Georgia
2020
Presidential